PG-13 is a common type of content rating that applies to media entertainment, such as films and television shows, generally denoting, "Parental Guidance: Some material may be inappropriate for children under 13 to 15. Countries and organizations that use the rating include:

 The Motion Picture Association film rating system in the United States
 The Media Development Authority in Singapore
 The film classification system used in Jamaica
 The film classification system used by the Ministry of Information of the United Arab Emirates
 The television classification system used in Thailand

The "PG-13" rating is further documented at Motion picture content rating system and Television content rating system.

PG-13 may also refer to:
PG-13 (album), an album by Sharon Needles
PG-13 (professional wrestling), the wrestling team
Paul George, professional basketball player, nicknamed PG-13